Colombia competed at the 2020 Summer Paralympics in Tokyo, Japan, from 24 August to 5 September 2021.

Medalists

Competitors
The following is the list of number of competitors participating in the Games:

Archery 

Colombia entered one female archer to compete.

Athletics 

Nineteen athletes have qualified to compete.
Men's track

Men's field

Women's track

Women's field

Boccia 

Three Colombian boccia players classified to BC4 events.

Cycling 

Colombia sent one male and one female cyclist after successfully getting a slot in the 2018 UCI Nations Ranking Allocation quota for the Americas.

Road
Colombia entered a squad of six riders (four men and two women) to compete in their respective Paralympic road races.

Track

Powerlifting

Colombia entered four powerlifters (three men and one woman) to the 2020 Summer Paralympics.

Swimming 

Thirteen Colombian swimmers have qualified to compete at the 2020 Summer Paralympics via the 2019 World Para Swimming Championships slot allocation method including Carlos Serrano Zarate who is a defending champion in the 100m breaststroke SB7 & eight athlete qualified via MQS.
Men

Women

Mixed

Table tennis

Men

Wheelchair basketball 

The men's team qualified after winning the bronze medal at the 2019 Parapan American Games held in Lima, Peru.

Group A

11th–12th classification match

Wheelchair tennis

Colombia qualified two players entries for wheelchair tennis. Angélica Bernal qualified by winning the gold medal at the 2019 Parapan American Games in Lima, Peru. Meanwhile Johana Martinez qualified by world rankings.

See also 
 Colombia at the Paralympics
 Colombia at the 2020 Summer Olympics

References 

Nations at the 2020 Summer Paralympics
2020
2021 in Colombian sport